Dante is an Italian given name and surname. Etymologically, it is short for an old given name, Durante, and was first made popular by the Italian poet Dante Alighieri, whose real name was Durante.

Notable people with the name include:

Given name
Commander Dante, another name for Bernardo Buscayno, who became military leader of the New People's Army in the Philippines in October 1970
Count Dante (1939–1975), American karate instructor
Dante Agostini (1920–1980), Italian-born French drummer and pedagogue
Dante Alighieri, 14th-century Tuscan author of The Divine Comedy
Dante Arthurs (born 1984), Australian child murderer
Dante Basco (born 1975), Filipino-American actor
Dante Benedetti (1919–2005), American restaurateur and baseball coach
Dante Daniel Bonaduce (born 1959), American actor, comedian, radio personality, television personality, and professional wrestler, known professionally as Danny Bonaduce
Dante Bowe, American Christian musician
Dante Cappelli (1866–1948), Italian actor
Dante Caputo (born 1943), Argentine politician
Dante Carnesecchi (1892–1921), Italian anarchist
Dante Carver (born 1977), American actor
Dante David (1955–2008), Filipino radio disc jockey known as "Howlin' Dave"
Dante DeCaro (born 1981), Canadian guitarist/songwriter
Dante Fascell (1917–1998), 20th-century Florida politician
Dante Ferretti (born 1943), Italian art director
Dante Giacosa (1905–1996), Italian car designer
Dante Lauretta (born 1970), American chemist
Dante Leonelli (born 1931), American sculptor
Dante da Maiano, 13th-century Italian poet
Dante Maggio (1909–1992), Italian film actor
Dante Marioni (born 1964), American glass artist
Dante Pereira-Olson, American actor
Dante Quinterno (1909–2003), Argentine comics artist
Dante Rivera (born 1974), American mixed martial arts fighter
Dante Roberson (born 1972), American musician
Dante Gabriel Rossetti (1828–1882), 19th-century English painter
Dante Smith (born 1973), a.k.a. Mos Def, American musician, actor and poet
Dante Spinetta (born 1976), Argentine singer/composer
Dante Spinotti (born 1943), Italian cinematographer
Dante Testa (1861–1923), Italian actor and director
Dante "Tex" Gill (1930−2003), American gangster and massage parlor owner
Dante Tiñga (born 1939), Filipino politician and jurist
Dante Tomaselli (born 1969), American screenwriter and director
Dante Troisi (1920–1989), Italian writer and magistrate

Sportspeople
Dante Agostini (canoeist) (born 1923), Italian sprint canoeist and Olympic competitor
Dante Amaral (born 1980), Brazilian volleyball player typically known by his first name only
Dante Bichette (born 1963), American Major League Baseball player
Dante Bonfim Costa Santos (born 1983), Brazilian footballer
Dante Boninfante (born 1977), Italian volleyball player
Dante Booker (born 1977), American football player
Dante Brown (born 1980), American football player
Dante Calabria (born 1973), American basketball player
Dante Campbell (born 1999), Canadian soccer player
Dante Cunningham (born 1987), American basketball player
Dante Exum (born 1995), Australian basketball player
Dante Fowler (born 1994), American football player
Dante Hall (born 1978), American football player
Dante Hughes (born 1985), American football player
Dante Lavelli (1923–2009), American football player
Dante López (born 1983), Paraguayan football player
Dante Love (born 1986), American college football player
Dante Magnani (1917–1985), American football player
Dante Marini (born 1992), American soccer player
Dante Marsh (born 1981), Canadian football player
Dante Micheli (1939–2012), Italian football player
Dante Mircoli (born 1947), Argentine footballer
Dante Olson (born 1997), American football player
Dante Anthony Pastorini (born 1949), American football quarterback known as Dan Pastorini
Dante Pettis (born 1995), American football player
Dante Ridgeway (born 1984), American arena football player
Dante Rosario (born 1984), American football player
Dante Rossi (1936–2013), Italian water polo player
Dante Scarnecchia (born 1948), American offensive line coach, assistant head coach for the New England Patriots
Dante Senger (born 1983), Argentine footballer
Dante Washington (born 1970), American soccer player
Dante Wesley (born 1979), American football player

Surname
Joe Dante (born 1946), American director
Michael Dante (born 1931), American actor, stage and screen director and former professional athlete
Peter Dante (born 1968), American actor

Mononym 

 Dante (comedian) (born 1970), American comedian
 Dante (crossword compiler), one of the pseudonyms of Roger Squires, British crossword compiler

Fictional characters
 Dante (Devil May Cry), the protagonist of the video game series Devil May Cry
 Dante (Fullmetal Alchemist), a villainess in the anime Fullmetal Alchemist
 Dante, one of The Titans in the Legends of Dune series of novels
 Dante, in the American television series One Tree Hill
 Dante, in the James Joyce novel A Portrait of the Artist as a Young Man
 Dante, in the comic strip Sheldon
 Dante, the main character of Demon Lord Dante
Dante, a Mexican hairless dog from the 2017 Pixar movie Coco
 Dante Adams, in the 2010 video game Medal of Honor
Dante Alighieri, the main character in Tage Danielsson's book and film The Man Who Quit Smoking
Dante Dalmatian, a puppy on 101 Dalmatian Street
 Dante Damiano, on the soap opera The Bold and the Beautiful
 Dante Falconeri, on the ABC soap opera General Hospital
Dante Fiero (Dennis Feinstein), a businessman in US sitcom Parks and Recreation
 Dante Hicks, the protagonist of Clerks, Clerks 2, and Clerks: The Animated Series
Dante Koryu, main protagonist in the anime Beyblade Burst Rise
Dante Moro, an assassination target in the video game Assassin's Creed II
Inferno (Dante Pertuz), superhero appearing in American comic books published by Marvel Comics
Dante Quintana, from the novel Aristotle and Dante Discover the Secrets of the Universe by Benjamin Alire Sáenz
Dante Rossi, from the comic Fence by C. S. Pacat
Dante Vale, a major character from Huntik: Secrets & Seekers series
Dante Zogratis, villain in the anime Black Clover
 Baron Dante, the villain of video games Croc: Legend of the Gobbos and Croc 2
 Commander Dante, the Chapter Master of the Blood Angels in Warhammer 40,000
Jack Dante, the evil genius inventor in the movie Death Machine
 Kerberos Dante, a Saint Seiya character
 Silvio Dante, on the HBO TV series The Sopranos

See also
Daunte, given name
Donta, given name and surname
Dontae, given name
Donte, given name
Edmond Dantès, the lead character in the classic Alexandre Dumas novel The Count of Monte Cristo
Harry August Jansen, American magician who performed under the name "Dante the Magician"

Italian masculine given names
Spanish masculine given names
Given names
Surnames